Donghu Station is a station on Line 6 of the Guangzhou Metro. It is located underground the Yuexiu District and started operation on 28December 2013.

Station layout

Exits

References

Railway stations in China opened in 2013
Guangzhou Metro stations in Yuexiu District